This is the discography of American R&B singer, Joe.

Albums

Studio albums

Compilation albums

Live albums

Video albums

EPs

Singles

As lead artist

As featured artist

References

External links

 
 
Joe
Rhythm and blues discographies
Soul music discographies